Emiliano Pizzoli (born 29 June 1974 in Rieti) is a former Italian hurdler.

Biography
Emiliano Pizzoli won two medals, at senior level, at the International athletics competitions. He participated at one edition of the Summer Olympics (2000), he has 19 caps in national team from 1995 to 2008. His personal best time is 13.43 seconds, achieved in June 1998 in Milan. The Italian records currently belongs to Emanuele Abate with 13.28 seconds (outdoor) and 7.57 (indoor).

He won the bronze medal at the 1997 Mediterranean Games. He also participated at the World Championships in 1999, the World Indoor Championships in 1999 and 2001 and the 2000 Olympic Games without reaching the final.

National records
 60 metres hurdles: 7.60 ( Valencia, 28 February 1998) - holder till 4 February 2012

Achievements

National titles
He has won 11 times the individual national championship.
5 wins in the 110 metres hurdles (2000, 2001, 2002, 2003, 2004)
6 wins in the 60 metres hurdles indoor (1999, 2000, 2001, 2003, 2004, 2007)

See also
 Italian all-time top lists - 110 metres hurdles

References

External links
 
 

1974 births
Living people
Italian male hurdlers
Athletics competitors of Centro Sportivo Carabinieri
Athletes (track and field) at the 2000 Summer Olympics
Olympic athletes of Italy
Mediterranean Games bronze medalists for Italy
Athletes (track and field) at the 1997 Mediterranean Games
World Athletics Championships athletes for Italy
Mediterranean Games medalists in athletics
People from Rieti
Sportspeople from the Province of Rieti